Pseudozelota mima is a species of beetle in the family Cerambycidae. It was described by Stephan von Breuning in 1938, originally under the genus Parazelota. It is known from Borneo.

References

Mesosini
Beetles described in 1938